Supernova (stylized as SUPERNOVA) is the fourth album of Japanese rock band, Granrodeo. It was released on 6 April 2011.

Song Information 
 "Koi Oto" was released as a single.
 "Rose Hip-Bullet" was used as the 1st opening theme to the 2009 TV anime "Togainu no Chi".
 "Shanimuni" was added as an insert song for the single "Koi Oto"
 "SEA OF STARS" was added as an insert song for the Non–album single "We wanna R&R SHOW"

Track listing

Personnel 
 Kishow: vocals, lyrics
 E-Zuka: lead guitar, backing vocals, Arranging

Charts

References
Official mobile site
 初回限定盤
 通常盤

2011 albums
Granrodeo albums